How High 2 is a 2019 American stoner comedy television film directed by Bruce Leddy and starring Lil Yachty and DC Young Fly. It is a sequel to the 2001 film How High and first aired on MTV on April 20, 2019. The film centers around two stoners who go on a mission to track down their missing marijuana and "weed bible".  While the film does not feature the original film's stars Method Man and Redman, actors reprising their roles include Mike Epps, Al Shearer and T. J. Thyne.

Plot
Roger is an Atlanta stoner who dreams of opening up a weed delivery business but was recently fired from his fast food job. He lives in his mother's basement with his ride share driver cousin Calvin, who moonlights as a weed dealer. While Atlanta is in the midst of a weed shortage, the pair find a "Weed Bible" in their basement which shows them how to grow a special new kind of weed. They then set off to start a weed delivery business but their stash and weed bible is stolen. With the help of Roger's childhood friend Alicia, they set off on a mission across the city to track down their stash while fending off rival drug dealers, the Russian mob, college co-eds & frat guys and a pharmaceutical corporation.

Cast

Production
In October 2008, Redman revealed that a script for the sequel was in the middle of being written, stating that "we wanna represent all the smokers", believing that since How High, no one has done justice on a stoner film. In April 2009, it was reported that Redman blames Universal Pictures for the film's delay, stating: "They're not opening that money door for us to shoot it. We promoted the shit out of that movie. We got the whole world waiting for a How High 2."
 
In December 2010, Redman confirmed that Universal Pictures is indeed holding the rights to How High, so the chances of How High 2 coming out are slim. In April 2013, Method Man told TMZ that the script was being written by Dustin Lee Abraham, who wrote the first one, but it all would depend on Universal if the film would happen.
 
In November 2015, Redman stated that the film would be released in 2017.
 
In 2017, there was a written script, confirmed by Matt "M-80" Markoff. Redman stated that the script is being "rewritten" because he did not like the script. He expects production to begin late 2017, early 2018. In November 2017, Redman said that if the draft is not as funny as the original draft, he and Method Man would move on to something other than the sequel. Redman has confirmed that him and Method Man are not reprising their roles in the sequel because "the business wasn't right".
 
The sequel was greenlit by MTV and Universal 1440 Entertainment as of June 25, 2018 and was announced to take place in Atlanta. Production started as of September 25, 2018 and the film was announced to star Lil Yachty and DC Young Fly.
 	
On March 7, 2019, MTV announced that the film How High 2 would premiere on April 20, 2019, 420 Day, and that Mike Epps would reprise his role of Baby Powder from the first film. They also released the opening credits sequence.

Reception
How High 2 on its premiere airing drew 801,000 viewers in live + same day viewing and a 0.64 rating in viewers aged 18–49, giving MTV its highest-rated Saturday in six years.

References

External links
 
 

2019 television films
2019 films
2019 comedy films
2010s American films
2010s buddy comedy films
2010s English-language films
2010s teen comedy films
African-American comedy films
American buddy comedy films
American comedy television films
American films about cannabis
American sequel films
American teen comedy films
Films about cousins
Films set in 2019
Films set in Atlanta
Films set in universities and colleges
Films shot in Atlanta
MTV original films
Stoner films
Television sequel films
Universal Pictures films